Influencers Church, formerly Paradise Community Church, is a Pentecostal church affiliated to the Assemblies of God, with congregations in the state of South Australia, Australia, and in the southern United States. It was founded in Adelaide in 1922. In February 2023, Influencers Church will become Futures Church.

History
The church was founded in 1922 by British evangelist Smith Wigglesworth., becoming known as Adelaide Assembly of God (AOG) when a property on Franklin Street, Adelaide was purchased in 1944. In 1951 Tom Evans, a British missionary from India, became senior pastor. Pastors John and Beryl Jobe commenced as senior pastors in 1959. Their vision was to move into the suburbs where the people lived, so the Franklin Street property was sold, and the church relocated to Payneham, before it shifted to Main North East Road Klemzig.

In 1970, Andrew Evans, the oldest son of Tom Evans, became the first non-founding senior pastor of Klemzig Assembly of God. Under his ministry the church grew from weekly church attendance of 150 to over 2,000 people. 

In 1982, the church moved to its current location in Paradise, becoming known as Paradise Assembly of God, and later changing its name to Paradise Community Church. At this time, Paradise AOG also set up Paradise (later Adelaide) College of Ministries, as an accredited bible college in South Australia. In 1994, members from the Paradise church formed a sister church, originally called Southside Christian Church, but later renamed Edge Church. The church also fostered the formation of Youth Alive Australia.

In 1997 the contemporary worship music band Planetshakers was created out of the first Planetshakers Conference. In 2000, Andrew Evans's youngest son Ashley and his wife Jane took over as senior pastors at Paradise, and the Planetshakers youth movement grew. In 2004, his eldest son Russell and wife Sam Evans moved to Melbourne to form Planetshakers Church.

In the 2000s, Paradise's church attendance grew to over 6,000 people, and it expanded to three other locations (Elizabeth, West, and City), introduced a Friday night service, and had become the fifth-largest church in Australia.

In 2012, Paradise Community Church changed its name to Influencers Church (Global) to reflect that the church is expanding internationally. As part of the change in structure, Ashley and Jane Evans	 appointed Josh and Sjhana as the Australian lead pastors as the Evans family moved to Atlanta, Georgia.

In November 2022, Influencers Church celebrated their 100th anniversary year since foundation, and announced that as of February 2023, the church will be renamed Futures Church.

Influence
Some political figures have connections with the church, including Andrew Evans who is father of current pastor Ashley Evans, a pastor at the prior Paradise Church for 30 years and was leader of the conservative Family First political party. Liberal Party of Australia foreign affairs minister Alexander Downer commented positively on the church's focus on God, the Bible and the message of Christ. Famous persons who have attended Paradise include Channel 9 journalist Kate Collins and actress Debra Byrne. The church was also featured on A Current Affair, Compass, The Australian, and The Age. Peter Goers has commonly cited the church in rhetoric light. Apart from media interest, the church also has a television program which screens in different countries and recently started airing each Sunday on Channel 9. Paradise also utilises regular television and radio advertisement for marketing communications, particularly during the Christmas and Easter seasons.

Ashley Evans has held the office of State President of Australian Christian Churches of South Australia and a previous member of the National Executive of the Australian Christian Churches. His wife Jane Evans has been influential as the national board member of charity Compassion Australia.

Music
The profile of Paradise was boosted after the inaugural Australian Idol, singer Guy Sebastian publicly announced his connection with the church as a singer. As a result of market perception of the church, the church launched its Paradise School of Music.

Influencers Church worship band Futures' first single "Imaginations", released on 8 September 2017, hit first place on the iTunes "Inspirational" charts on date of release. They subsequently released an EP called Imagine on in 2017 and their first album, Just the Cross in 2019. 

In 2021, Influencers Youth, the youth ministry of the church, went on to form a musical group called Dreamers, with the first EP "Land of the Living" being released on 13 August 2021, and first album self-titled Dreamers on 21 October 2022.

See also
Saddleback Church
Willowcreek Church
Mars Hill Church
Australian Christian Churches

References

External links

Churches in Adelaide
Pentecostal churches in Australia
Australian Christian Churches
Evangelical megachurches in Australia
Christian organizations established in 1907
1907 establishments in Australia